The Homeless World Cup is a social organization with the goal of ending homelessness through the sport of football. The organization hopes that engaging homeless people in football will encourage them to change their own lives and develop solutions to worldwide homelessness. The organization puts together an annual football tournament where teams of homeless people from each country compete.

The tenth edition of the Homeless World Cup annual football tournament was hosted by Mexico City in October 2012. The winner of men's Homeless World Cup was Chile.

Tournament details 

The winning team gets 3 points. The losing team gets zero points. If a match ends in a draw, it is decided by sudden-death penalty shootout and the winning team gets three points and the losing team gets one point.
Games are 14 minutes long, in two seven-minute halves.
The field is 22m (long) x 16m (wide).

2012 Homeless World Cup, Mexico City

There are 100 million  homeless people in our world today. This is a global issue that affects every nation.

Group stage

Group A

Group B

Group C

Group D

Group E

Group F 

Morocco withdrew.

Group G

Group H

Secondary Stage

Group A

Group B

Group C

Group D

Group E

Group F

Group G

Trophy Stage 

Qualified teams to play for different trophies:

The Homeless World Cup

The Homeless World Cup Finals

Winner

Classification Positions

The Fundación Telmex Cup

Winner

Final ranking 

Record: Wins - Penalty Wins - Losses

References

External links
 

Homeless World Cup
2012–13 in Mexican football
2012 in association football
Sports competitions in Mexico City
International association football competitions hosted by Mexico
October 2012 sports events in Mexico
2010s in Mexico City